The 2007 European Athletics Indoor Championships were held in the National Indoor Arena (NIA) in Birmingham, England, from Friday, 2 March to Sunday, 4 March 2007. Birmingham also held the 2003 IAAF World Indoor Championships.

Men's results

Track

Field

Combined

Women's results

Track

Field

Combined

Medal table

Participating nations

 (2)
 (1)
 (6)
 (1)
 (13)
 (6)
 (9)
 (4)
 (3)
 (10)
 (7)
 (10)
 (15)
 (31)
 (1)
 (31)
 (4)
 (40)
 (11)
 (7)
 (4)
 (13)
 (3)
 (17)
 (9)
 (1)
 (5)
 (1)
 (2)
 (3)
 (1)
 (1)
 (10)
 (7)
 (27)
 (6)
 (25)
 (64)
 (1)
 (4)
 (8)
 (14)
 (37)
 (15)
 (4)
 (4)
 (21)

See also
2007 in athletics (track and field)

References

External links
 Birmingham 2007 Official website
 EAA Official website

 
European Athletics Indoor Championships
E
European Indoor Championships in Athletics
International sports competitions in Birmingham, West Midlands
International athletics competitions hosted by England
European Indoor Championships in Athletics
2000s in Birmingham, West Midlands
Sport in Birmingham, West Midlands